Travel is the movement between distant locations.  Travelling or traveling may refer to:
 Traveling (basketball), a specific rule violation in the sport of basketball
 Travelling (Roxette album), 2012
 Travelling (Steve Howe album), 2010
 "Traveling" (song), by Utada Hikaru